John Ellard Gore (1845–1910) was an Irish amateur astronomer and prolific author, and a founding member of the British Astronomical Association.  He was mainly interested in variable stars of which he discovered several, most notably W Cygni in 1884, U Orionis in 1885, and independently discovered Nova Persei.
In 2009, the IAU named a lunar impact crater after Gore.

Early life
Gore was born in Athlone, County Westmeath, in 1845, the eldest son of the Venerable John Ribton Gore and Frances Brabazon Ellard. He had 3 brothers and one sister.  The Gore family descended from Sir Paul Gore, 1st Baronet and John's great grandfather was Sir Arthur Gore, 1st Baronet. He studied at Trinity College and received a diploma in Civil Engineering in 1865.

Professional career
Gore worked as a railway engineer in Ireland for over two years before being appointed as an assistant engineer with the Indian Public Works Department on the Sirhind Canal project.  In 1877 he returned to Ireland on two years leave of absence and lived in Ballysadare County Sligo with his father.  In 1879, he retired after 11 years of service with a pension and after the death of his father in 1894, moved to Dublin where he spent the rest of his life devoted to astronomy.

Astronomy
Gore had no formal training in astronomy, and began to study the sky while working in India.  While there, he relied on his naked eyes, binoculars, a three-inch telescope and a ten centimeter telescope on an equatorial mount.  His first book "Southern Stellar Objects for Small Telescopes" was published in India in 1877.

On his return to Ireland in 1877, he used a three-inch telescope and binoculars.  He set up an observatory in Sligo, and later set up at 3 Nortumberland Street, Dublin. His greatest contribution was his studies of double and variable stars, and he published catalogues of variables and binary stars.

Gore died on the 18th of July 1910 when struck by a horse and car whilst crossing Grafton St., Dublin.

Books

Legacy
In 2009, the IAU named a lunar impact crater located on the lunar near side near the northern pole after Gore.

References

External links
 
 

1910 deaths
People from County Westmeath
20th-century Irish writers
20th-century male writers
Amateur astronomers
Fellows of the Royal Astronomical Society
Irish astronomers
Alumni of Trinity College Dublin
Irish non-fiction writers
Irish male non-fiction writers
19th-century British astronomers
1845 births
Irish writers